Strophiona is a genus of beetles in the family Cerambycidae, containing the following species:

 Strophiona laeta (LeConte, 1857)
 Strophiona nitens (Forster, 1771)
 Strophiona tigrina Casey, 1913

References

Lepturinae
Taxa named by Thomas Lincoln Casey Jr.